Rinorea hymenosepala is a species of plant in the Violaceae family. It is endemic to Colombia.

References

hymenosepala
Endemic flora of Colombia
Endangered plants
Taxonomy articles created by Polbot